Matilda (December 955 – 999), also known as Mathilda and Mathilde, was a German regent, and the first Princess-Abbess of Quedlinburg. She served as regent of Germany for her brother during his absence in 967, and as regent during the minority of her nephew from 984. 

She was the daughter of Otto I, Holy Roman Emperor, and his second wife, Adelaide of Italy.

Nun 
Her grandmother, Saint Matilda, founded the Quedlinburg Abbey in 936. In April 966, in a splendid ceremony requested by her father, the eleven-year-old granddaughter and namesake of Saint Matilda was elected suae metropolitanae sibi haereditariae.

Regency 
A year after becoming abbess, Matilda was assigned as regent of the kingdom when her father and brother Otto went to Italy. As regent, Matilda held a reforming synod at Dornberg. concerning the church in Germany. 

In 968, the monk Widukind of Corvey dedicated to Matilda his opus magnum Die Sachsengeschichte, in which he called her the mistress of all Europe. The book, that described the history of the Saxons' struggle against the Magyars up to the death of Otto I in 973, also served as a kind of manual for ruling, including advices on how to deal with deceit and betrayal.

In 984, she held an imperial diet at her abbey. At the diet, Henry the Wrangler questioned the right of Matilda's nephew to succeed his father. Matilda successfully defeated his claims and secured the election of her nephew as Holy Roman Emperor, therefore "holding the empire together". A contemporary chronicler described her regency as being "without female levity". Matilda succeeded in restoring peace and authority by leading an army against the "barbarians".

In 985, Wallhausen (now in Saxony-Anhalt) became her private property.

In 984, Matilda, her mother, Empress Adelaide, and her sister-in-law, Empress Theophanu, became co-regents for Matilda's young nephew, Otto III. 

In 994, she secured market rights, as well as coinage and customs privileges from Otto III to Quedlinburg. From a few huts, Quedlinburg developed into a prosperous city.

In 997, as Otto III increasingly shifted his focus to Italy (she accompanied him there in his first trip), he handed over the rulership of Germany to her, overriding the authority of all bishops and dukes. In seven years, she was the only member of the dynasty to have a presence in Saxony.

In 998, she held a Diet (Hoftag) in Derenburg, heard requests and appointed offices.

In contemporary documents, she was called metropolitana ("overseer of bishops) and mattricia ("matriarch").

Death 
She died in February 999 and was succeeded as abbess of Quedlinburg by her niece, Adelaide I.

Cultural depictions
A poem from the end of the Ottonian era  (on a reliquary of the confessor Marsus and the virgin Lugtrudis in Ottonian convent of Essen) and made under the Abbess Theophanu (died 1056) reads:
        Hoc opus eximium gemmis auroque decorum Mathildis vovit, 
        Theophanu quod bene solvit 
        Regi dans regum Mathildt haec crysea dona 
        Abbatissa bona; quae rex deposcit in aevum 
        Spiritus Ottonis pauset caelestibus oris.
        Matilda made a votive offering of this excellent work,
        Beautiful in its jewels and gold, which Theophanu disposed of;
        Good abbess Matilda, giving to the King of Kings these golden gifts, 
        Which the king everlastingly keeps asking for, 
        May the spirit of Otto tarry on the celestial shores. 
In 2013,  Mitteldeutscher Rundfunk made the documentary Mathilde von Quedlinburg - Vom Mädchen zur Machtfrau (Matilda of Quedlinburg, from young girl to woman of power), or Geschichte Mitteldeutschlands - Mathilde. Die erste Äbtissin Quedlinburgs (Working title).

Commemoration
In 1999, the 1000th Anniversary of her death was commemorated, especially in Quedlinburg with a colloquium and an exhibition.

Ancestry

References

Sources and further reading
 Gerd Althoff: Gandersheim und Quedlinburg. Ottonische Frauenklöster als Herrschafts- und Überlieferungszentren. In: Frühmittelalterliche Studien, Jahrbuch des Instituts für Frühmittelalterforschung an der Universität Münster. Vol. 25, 1991, S. 123–144
 Gerd Althoff: Mathilde. In: Lexikon des Mittelalters. Band VI, Artemis & Winkler Verlag, München und Zürich, 1993, ISBN 3-7608-8906-9
 
 
 Gerlinde Schlenker: Äbtissin Mathilde : eine Quedlinburgerin als Reichverweserin vor 1000 Jahren. Stekovics, Halle an der Saale, 1999. ISBN 3-932863-14-3
 Christian Marlow: Augusta und „funkelnder Edelstein“ – Äbtissin Mathilde von Quedlinburg zum 1020. Todesjahr (999 –2019) In: Sachsen-Anhalt Journal 29 (2019), H. 3, S. 14–16

|-

955 births
10th-century German women
Ottonian dynasty
Abbesses of Quedlinburg
10th-century women rulers
999 deaths
German people of Danish descent
German people of Italian descent
Daughters of emperors
Daughters of kings